Alice R. Crites is a Washington Post librarian and the researcher on the three-member team that won the 2018 Pulitzer Prize for Investigative Reporting.

Crites has been a researcher on six different Pulitzer-winning teams at Washington Post, 2006, 2008, 2015, 2016, 2017, and 2018. She is an advocate for the role of researchers and news libraries in the support of journalism, saying "We're cost effective. We're expert searchers.... We not only get information, but also help avoid making mistakes."

Early life and education 
Crites is the daughter of an NIH cancer researcher and a librarian for the Montgomery County Schools. She graduated from University of Maryland, and received an M.A. in English and literary criticism from Carnegie Mellon University. She worked for the Congressional Research Service at the Library of Congress before getting her MLS from the University of Maryland.

Career 
Crites started as a weekend worker at the Washington Post in 1990 and was hired full-time in 1992. She specializes in research and reporting on government and politics; she has covered elections since 1994. Her writing has appeared in the Seattle Times and Washington Post She worked with the Post'''s print news library, the News Research Center, which included approximately "7,500 books, 30 periodicals a month and 15 daily newspapers." In more recent years, she's used computer-assisted reporting as well as many specialty databases to pursue her work, noting in 2007 that some material--U.S. senators’ legal defense fund documents, for example--could still only be accessed in person.

Part of Crites' work investigating Senate candidate Roy Moore involved combating misinformation that was being disseminated by Project Veritas to try to discredit the Washington Post's reporting. Crites uncovered a GoFundMe page that linked Project Veritas to a woman who had been telling the Post that Roy Moore had impregnated her as a legally-underage teenager, and urging them to report on it. She also directly refuted Moore's claim's that an Alabama county didn’t sell alcohol--when he'd been accused of procuring alcohol for a minor in that county--by finding evidence that the county allowed liquor sales seven years before the event occurred. Her research allowed the Post'' to outline a clear well-established case against Moore.

References

External links 
 
 

American librarians
The Washington Post journalists
Pulitzer Prize for Investigative Reporting winners
Year of birth missing (living people)
Living people
American women librarians
American women journalists
20th-century American journalists
20th-century American women writers
21st-century American journalists
21st-century American women writers
Journalists from Maryland
University System of Maryland alumni
Carnegie Mellon University alumni